Dylan Evans (born 25 January 1989) is an Australian-born, Welsh-qualified, rugby union player who most recently played for the Scarlets at prop.

Evans made his debut for the Scarlets in 2015 having previously played Newcastle RFC, NSW Country as well as playing rugby for Sydney University, coming through the Brumbies Academy and completing a preseason with the Melbourne Rebels.

On 21 August 2020 it was announced that he joined Glasgow Warriors on a short-term loan deal. He was named straight in the 23 to play Edinburgh Rugby in the 1872 Cup.

References

External links 
Scarlets Player Profile

1989 births
Living people
Australian rugby union players
Glasgow Warriors players
Rugby union players from Maitland, New South Wales
Rugby union props
Scarlets players